Mocis annetta is a species of moth of the family Erebidae. It is found in Russia (south-eastern Siberia, Amur, Ussuri, Primorje), China (Shaanxi), Korea, Taiwan and Japan (Hokkaido, Honshu).

References

Moths described in 1878
Moths of Asia
Moths of Korea
Moths of Japan
Moths of Taiwan
annetta